Fighting Squadron 9 or VF-9 was an aviation unit of the U.S. Navy, originally established on 1 March 1942, it was disestablished on 28 September 1945.

Operational history

VF-9 established at NAS Norfolk on 1 March 1942 as part of the new Carrier Air Group 9 (CVG-9) which was to be deployed abord the new carrier . Originally equipped with the F2A-3 Buffalo, VF-9 began reequipping with the F4F-3 Wildcat in April 1942.

In late August 1942 VF-9 was deployed aboard  to support Operation Torch. By late November 1942 Ranger had returned to NAS Norfolk and VF-9 rejoined the rest of CVG-9. VF-9 became the first Navy squadron to receive the F6F-3 Hellcat in February 1943.

In April 1943 CVG-9 embarked on the Essex for deployment to the Pacific Fleet. By mid-June 1943 Essex had arrived at Naval Station Pearl Harbor and CVG-9 was based at Naval Air Station Barbers Point. In September Essex left Pearl Harbor with CVG-9 embarked.

VF-9 scored over 250 kills in the Hellcat, making it the second most successful Hellcat squadron of the war.

Home port assignments
NAS Norfolk

Aircraft assignment
F2A-3 Buffalo
F4F-3 Wildcat
F6F-3/5 Hellcat

Notable former members
Herbert N. Houck
Eugene A. Valencia, Jr.
Thomas Mack Wilhoite
Hamilton McWhorter III

See also
 List of inactive United States Navy aircraft squadrons
 History of the United States Navy

References

External links

Aircraft squadrons of the United States Navy